The Swabian Maiden (Swabian German: Das Schwabemädle) is a 1919 German silent comedy film directed by Georg Jacoby and Ernst Lubitsch and starring Ossi Oswalda, Carl Auen and Hermann Böttcher.

It was shot at the Tempelhof Studios in Berlin.

Cast
Ossi Oswalda as Lorle Schmied 
Carl Auen as Uhrmachergeselle Christoph Bühler 
Fritz Achterberg as Sohn Fred Hausegger 
Hermann Böttcher as Kammerherr 
Aenderly Lebius as Fabrikbesitzer Ferdinand Hausegger 
Paul Passarge as Uhrmacher Johann Schmied 
Frl. von Basch as Hertha von Lossow

References

External links

Films of the Weimar Republic
German silent feature films
Films directed by Georg Jacoby
Films directed by Ernst Lubitsch
German comedy films
1919 comedy films
UFA GmbH films
Films shot at Tempelhof Studios
German black-and-white films
Silent comedy films
1910s German films